Ann Roth Pytkowicz Streissguth (born December 13, 1932) is a scientist known for her groundbreaking research on fetal alcohol spectrum disorder. She is an Endowed Professor Emeritus and Founding Director of the Fetal Alcohol Drug Unit at the University of Washington School of Medicine.

She is the author of Fetal alcohol syndrome: A guide for families and communities and The challenge of fetal alcohol syndrome: Overcoming secondary disabilities.  These books guide families on how to overcome the detrimental effects brought on by fetal alcohol syndrome.

Awards 
Streissguth was awarded the University of Washington Outstanding Public Service Award in 1997, and the Rosett Award  in 1998 for her contributions to research on fetal alcohol syndrome. She received the American Psychological Foundation's Gold Medal for Lifetime Achievement for Psychology in the Public Interest in 2002, and an Excellence Award from the National Organization on Fetal Alcohol Syndrome in 2003. In 2005, Streissguth received an Honorary Doctorate Award in the Humanities from her undergraduate alma mater, Oregon State University.

Biography 
Streissguth was born in South Pasadena, California. She received her B.S. degree at Oregon State University in 1954, and her M.S. degree at the University of California, Berkeley in 1959. In 1964 Streissguth received her Ph.D. from the University of Washington. Throughout her career, Streissguth participated in academic work at the University of Washington. She was hired as Assistant Professor for the Department of Psychiatry and Behavioral Sciences in 1968. She was associate professor from 1974-1979 until her promotion to Professor in 1979. She was named Professor Emeritus in 2005.

Streissguth is a longstanding member of the National Organization on Fetal Alcohol Syndrome. She is known for her research program on fetal alcohol syndrome, and its effects on child development. With her colleagues Kenneth Jones, David Smith and Christy Ulleland, Streissguth conducted research on eight children who were born to alcoholic mothers which resulted in the first widely circulated paper on fetal alcohol syndrome and its relation to alcohol abuse during pregnancy. Through her research she has been able to enlighten society of the detrimental effects fetal alcohol syndrome can have on all areas of life including cognitive functioning, attention deficits, and even on motor skills. Streissguth's longitudinal observations of children as they mature to adulthood has illuminated long-term consequences of alcohol use during pregnancy. Public awareness of her findings has led to a significant decrease in the amount of alcohol consumed in the United States.

Streissguth is married to Daniel Michener Streissguth and together they have one child.

References

American women psychologists
21st-century American psychologists
University of Washington alumni
University of Washington faculty
Oregon State University alumni
University of California, Berkeley alumni
1932 births
Living people
American women academics
21st-century American women
20th-century American psychologists